U5 or U-5 may refer to:

Vehicles and transportation

Air transport
 The IATA designator code for USA3000 Airlines

Automobiles
 Aiways U5, a Chinese compact electric SUV
 Luxgen U5, a Tawianese subcompact SUV

Roads and routes
 U5 (Berlin U-Bahn), a subway line in Berlin, Germany
 U-5, a subway line on the Munich U-Bahn in Germany
 Utah State Route 5, two different highways

Submarines
 German submarine U-5, one of several German submarines
  the lead boat of the class
 U-5 class submarine (Austria-Hungary), a class of three submarines built 1908–1911
 SM U-5 (Austria-Hungary), the lead boat of the class

Statistics
 U5, an unemployment figure released by the United States Bureau of Labor Statistics

Science
 U5 spliceosomal RNA
 mtDNA haplogroup U5, a subdivision of Haplogroup U (mtDNA)

Entertainment
 Ultima V: Warriors of Destiny, a computer role-playing game
U5, a music partnership between X5 Music Group and Universal Records